Rhodomicrobium  is a microaerobic to anaerobic, purple non-sulfur, cluster-building genus of bacteria. Rhodomicrobium uses bacteriochlorophyll a and bacteriochlorophyll b for photosynthesis and occurs in fresh- and sea-water and in soil

References

Further reading 
 
 
 
 

 

Hyphomicrobiales
Bacteria genera